Nothing Else may refer to:

 Nothing Else, a studio album by Lorn
 "Nothing Else" (song), a song by Cody Carnes
 "Nothing Else!", a song by Mura Masa from the album Mura Masa
 "Nothing Else", a song by Archive from the album Londinium